WBWD (540 AM Radio Zindagi) is a radio station licensed to Islip, New York and broadcasting an Indian and South Asian radio format.

History
The station, originally owned by South Shore Broadcasting, signed on as WBIC on October 16, 1959. Since the station occupied a Canadian clear-channel frequency, it was required to sign-off at sundown. Bob 'Bobaloo' Lewis, who would later gain fame as one of the “All Americans” on 77 WABC Radio in New York City, was one of the original DJs on WBIC.

WLIX (1967–1980s)
In June 1967, the station was purchased by Long Island Broadcasting Corporation, owned by marketer, former Mutual Broadcasting System chairman and would-be politician Malcolm E. Smith Jr.. The call letters were changed to WLIX effective June 26, 1967. By the early 1970s, it broadcast an automated "beautiful music" format, and on Sunday mornings an Italian-American music program hosted by Joe Rotolo.

Sometime in the mid-1970s, it changed to Christian programming, still as WLIX.

In 1981, this station was featured on the NBC series Real People, which was a cross between a newsmagazine and what can now be called reality television. In 1983, it was permitted to broadcast after dark, at reduced power.

WLUX (1990s)
In the mid-1990s, it was WLUX with a pop standards format.

WLIE (2000s)
In September 2002, the station changed call letters to WLIE and flipped formats to become a talk radio station, Mornings were hosted by David Weiss, Tracy Burgess, and later with Weiss and Amanda Clarke; and Steve Reggie with Traffic; Ed Tyll hosted mid-days, and Mike Seigel hosted drive-time with Matt Bartlett on Traffic; evenings featured a rotating schedule of brokered programing and overnights featured Jim Bohannon from Westwood One. Weekends featured Lynn Samuels. The Program Director of IslandTalk 540 was John McDermott, a long time producer at WOR.

Later the talk format was dropped for a business talk format. The WLIE call letters referred to the Long Island Expressway. Beginning in 2008, the station started airing Spanish language religious shows. It broadcast a variety format, including leased air-time and news/talk programs.

WBWD (2018–present)
On November 9, 2018, the station's call sign was changed to WBWD. On December 3, 2018, WBWD changed their format to Bollywood music, branded as "Bolly 540 AM".

In October 2020, the station was sold to Metro Mex USA LLC, and the station's format was changed to Spanish Christian. The sale was consummated on December 1, 2020, at a price of $700,000.

On December 10, 2020, the station was sold for $1.3 million to Yash Pandya's Om Sai Broadcasting. The station's format reverted to the previous Indian and South Asian format, Radio Zindagi.

References

External links

Christian 54 Online WLIX — online radio station named after the former WLIX

BWD
Radio stations established in 1960
Mass media in Suffolk County, New York
1960 establishments in New York (state)